The 2021 Emilia Romagna motorcycle Grand Prix (officially known as the Gran Premio Nolan del Made in Italy e dell'Emilia-Romagna) was the sixteenth round of the 2021 Grand Prix motorcycle racing season. It was held at the Misano World Circuit Marco Simoncelli in Misano Adriatico on 24 October 2021.

The VR46 team unveils a special livery that will be used by Marco Bezzecchi and Celestino Vietti in the Moto2 class, as well as Luca Marini in the MotoGP premier class. Sky Racing Team VR46, which usually wears black and blue livery, has now completely changed to yellow with Grazie Vale writing on the side of the bike. This was done as a form of respect for Valentino Rossi who decided to retire at the end of the 2021 season.

In the MotoGP class, Fabio Quartararo became the first French rider to win the MotoGP World Championship after main rival Francesco Bagnaia crashed out of the lead with five laps to go therefore clinching the championship with two grand prix remaining in the season.

In the Moto3 class, Red Bull KTM Ajo won their first Teams' Championship and third across all classes. It is their second championship for 2021 after having won the Moto2 Teams' Championship during the Aragon race.

Qualifying

MotoGP

 
 Lorenzo Savadori suffered a broken collarbone in a crash during practice and was declared unfit to compete.

Race

MotoGP

 Lorenzo Savadori suffered a broken collarbone in a crash during practice and was declared unfit to compete.

Moto2

 Joe Roberts suffered a broken collarbone in a crash during practice and withdrew from the event.

Moto3

Championship standings after the race
Below are the standings for the top five riders, constructors, and teams after the round.

MotoGP

Riders' Championship standings

Constructors' Championship standings

Teams' Championship standings

Moto2

Riders' Championship standings

Constructors' Championship standings

Teams' Championship standings

Moto3

Riders' Championship standings

Constructors' Championship standings

Teams' Championship standings

References

External links

Emilia Romagna
Emilia Romagna motorcycle Grand Prix
Emilia Romagna motorcycle Grand Prix
Emilia Romagna motorcycle Grand Prix